Sin Tu Amor may refer to:

 Sin Tu Amor (album), by Los Freddy's
 "Sin tu amor" by Miguel Sandoval (composer), recorded by Luigi Alva, 1963
 "Sin Tu Amor", 2000 song by Pedro Fernández from the album Yo no fui
 "Sin Tu Amor", 2005 song by Ana Gabriel from the album Dos amores un amante
 "Sin Tu Amor", 2005 song by Cristian Castro from the album Dias Felices
 "Sin Tu Amor", 2007 song by Alacranes Musical from the album Ahora y Siempre
 "Sin Tu Amor", 2007 song by Black Guayaba from the album No Hay Espacio
 "Sin Tu Amor" song on album Te Quiero: Romantic Style In Da World, 2007